Markus Lanz is a German talk show on ZDF named after the host Markus Lanz, first aired on 3 June 2008. The 75-minute show airs on Tuesday, Wednesday, and Thursday nights. The program is recorded in a television studio in Hamburg-Altona, normally a few hours before it airs, but sometimes it is broadcast live.

Content 
The program does not have a general topic. In each issue, Lanz has four to five guests, with whom he usually speaks individually. At the beginning of the program, he introduces the guests, who are sitting together in a group, with some information on the respective topic. Lanz writes the texts for the introduction of the guests himself. Then he speaks to the guests one by one. The topics are about current political and social developments, news from the entertainment industry (for example a new film or book), sporting events or the individual life story of the conversation partner.

If it emerges from the situation, the other guests participate in the individual conversation or discuss it. Especially with current stories, sometimes several guests are invited on the same topic, for example a politician and a journalist. Musical or sporty duos and relatives can also perform together.

If a musical guest is on the show, he will often end up playing a current song. He is accompanied by the moderator on the piano.

Audience ratings 

 Notes

Criticism 
In January 2014, an online petition was sent to the ZDF, which demanded the dismissal of Lanz. It received over 230,000 signatures within a few days. The petition responded to a conversation with the German politician Sahra Wagenknecht, during which the moderator repeatedly interrupted her and asked her suggestive questions. Lanz then regretted his behavior, which he described as „rustikal und sogar persönlich" ("rustic and even personal").

References

External links 
 Official website (in German)
 Markus Lanz on fernsehserien.de
ZDF original programming
German television shows
German television talk shows
2008 German television series debuts
2000s German television series
2010s German television series
2020s German television series